George Randolph Scott (January 23, 1898 – March 2, 1987) was an American film actor whose career spanned the years from 1928 to 1962.  As a leading man for all but the first three years of his cinematic career, Scott appeared in a variety of genres, including social dramas, crime dramas, comedies, musicals (albeit in non-singing and non-dancing roles), adventure tales, war films, and a few horror and fantasy films. However, his most enduring image is that of the tall-in-the-saddle Western hero. Out of his more than 100 film appearances over 60 were in Westerns.  According to editor Edward Boscombe, "...Of all the major stars whose name was associated with the Western, Scott [was] most closely identified with it."

Scott's more than 30 years as a motion picture actor resulted in his working with many acclaimed screen directors, including Henry King, Rouben Mamoulian, Michael Curtiz, John Cromwell, King Vidor, Allan Dwan, Fritz Lang, Sam Peckinpah, Henry Hathaway (eight times), Ray Enright (seven), Edwin L. Marin (seven), Andre DeToth (six), and most notably, his seven film collaborations with Budd Boetticher. Scott also worked with a diverse array of cinematic leading ladies, from Shirley Temple and Irene Dunne to Mae West and Marlene Dietrich. His profile was incorporated into the original logo of the Las Vegas Raiders 

At , lanky, muscular, and handsome, Scott displayed what was seen as an easygoing charm and courtly Southern drawl in his early films that helped offset his limitations as an actor, where he was frequently found to be stiff or "lumbering". As he matured, however, Scott's acting was viewed as having improved, while his features became burnished and leathery, allowing him to portray a "strong, silent" type of stoic hero.

During the early 1950s, Scott was a consistent box-office draw. In the annual Motion Picture Herald Top Ten Polls, he ranked 10th in 1950, seventh in 1951, and 10th in both 1952 and 1953. Scott also appeared in Quigley's Top Ten Money Makers Poll from 1950 to 1953.
Scott’s face was also the model for the pirate in the Las Vegas Raiders logo since 1960 when the Raiders were originally located in Oakland, California.

Early years
Scott was born in Orange County, Virginia and reared in Charlotte, North Carolina, the second of six children born to parents of Scottish descent. His father was George Grant Scott, born in Franklin, Virginia, the first person licensed as a certified public accountant (CPA) in North Carolina. His mother was Lucille Crane Scott, born in Luray, Virginia, a member of a wealthy North Carolina family. The Scott children in order of birth were: Margaret, Randolph, Katherine, Virginia, Joseph and Barbara, most born in North Carolina.

Because of his family's financial status, Randolph was able to attend private schools such as Woodberry Forest School. From an early age, Scott developed and displayed his athleticism, excelling in football, baseball, horse racing, and swimming.

World War I
In April 1917, the United States entered World War I. In July, Scott joined a unit of the North Carolina National Guard. He was trained as an artillery observer and earned promotion to corporal in October 1917 and sergeant in February 1918. In May 1918, Scott entered active duty at Fort Monroe, Virginia as a member of the 2nd Trench Mortar Battalion. The battalion arrived in France in June 1918, and took part in combat with the U.S. IV Corps in the Toul sector and Thiaucourt zone. After the Armistice of November 11, 1918 ended the war, the 2nd TM Battalion took part in the post-war occupation of Germany as part of U.S. VI Corps.

Following the armistice, Scott enrolled in the artillery Officer Candidate School, which was located in Saumur. He received his commission as a second lieutenant of Field Artillery in May 1919 and departed for the United States soon afterwards. He arrived in New York City on June 6 and reported to Camp Mills, where he received his honorable discharge on June 13. Scott made use of his wartime experience in his acting career, including his training in horsemanship and the use of firearms.

After World War I
With his military career over Scott continued his education at Georgia Tech, where he was a member of the Kappa Alpha Order and set his sights on becoming an all-American football player. However a back injury prevented him from achieving this goal. Scott then transferred to the University of North Carolina, where he majored in textile engineering and manufacturing. He eventually dropped out and went to work as an accountant in the textile firm where his father, a CPA, was employed.

Career

Stage and early film appearances

Early films
Around 1927, Scott developed an interest in acting and decided to make his way to Los Angeles and seek a career in the motion picture industry. Fortunately, Scott's father had become acquainted with Howard Hughes and provided a letter of introduction for his son to present to the eccentric millionaire filmmaker. Hughes responded by getting Scott a small part in a George O'Brien film called Sharp Shooters (1928). A print of the film survives in the UCLA Film and Television Archive.

In the next few years, Scott continued working as an extra and bit player in several films, including Weary River (1929) with Richard Barthelmess, The Far Call (1929), The Black Watch (1929) (directed by John Ford with John Wayne also uncredited) and uncredited as the Rider in The Virginian (1929) with Gary Cooper. Reputedly, Scott also served as Cooper's dialect coach in this latter film.

Scott was also uncredited on Dynamite (1929) directed by Cecil B. DeMille, and Ford's Born Reckless (1930).

Stage
On the advice of Cecil B. DeMille, Scott gained much-needed acting experience by performing in stage plays with the Pasadena Playhouse. His stage roles during this period include:

 A minister in Gentlemen Be Seated
 A butler in Nellie, the Beautiful Model
 Metellus Cimber in William Shakespeare's Julius Caesar
 Hector Malone in George Bernard Shaw's Man and Superman

In 1932 Scott appeared in a play at the Vine Street Theatre in Hollywood entitled Under a Virginia Moon. His performance in this play resulted in several offers for screen tests by the major movie studios. Scott eventually signed a seven-year contract with Paramount Pictures at a salary of US$400 per week.

Movie debut
In between his Pasadena Playhouse days and Vine Street Theatre performance Scott made his film debut.

In 1931 Scott played his first leading role (with Sally Blane) in Women Men Marry (1931), a film, now apparently lost, made by a Poverty Row studio called Headline Pictures. A silent film by the same name from 1922, directed by Edward Dillon, has apparently been preserved, however, at Filmmuseum Amsterdam.

He followed that movie with a supporting part in a Warner Bros. production starring George Arliss, A Successful Calamity (1932).

Paramount

Zane Grey apprenticeship

Scott's first role under his new Paramount contract was a small supporting part in a comedy called Sky Bride (1932) starring Richard Arlen and Jack Oakie.

Following that, however, Paramount cast him as the lead in Heritage of the Desert (1932), his first significant starring role and also the one that established him as a Western hero. As with Women Men Marry, Sally Blane was his leading lady. Henry Hathaway made his directorial debut with Heritage of the Desert. The film was popular and Scott would go on to make ten "B" Western films loosely based on the novels of Zane Grey.

Many of these Grey adaptations were remakes of earlier silent films or even retitled versions of more recent movies. In an effort to save on production costs, Paramount utilized stock footage from the silent version and even hired some of the same actors, such as Raymond Hatton and Noah Beery, to repeat their roles, meaning that sometimes their ages would vary eight or more years during the same scene. For the 1933 films The Thundering Herd and Man of the Forest, Scott's hair was darkened and he sported a trim moustache so that he could easily be matched to footage of Jack Holt, the star of the silent versions.

In between his work in the Zane Grey Western series, Paramount cast Scott in several non-Western roles, such as "the other man" in Hot Saturday (1932), with Nancy Carroll and Cary Grant. Scott returned to Zane Grey Westerns with Wild Horse Mesa (1932), then was the romantic male lead in Hello, Everybody! (1933). The Thundering Herd (1933) was another Zane Grey Western with Hathaway, then he was in two horror movies, Murders in the Zoo (1933) with Lionel Atwill and Supernatural (1933) with Carole Lombard.  After the Western Sunset Pass (1933), Paramount loaned Scott to Columbia, to play Bebe Daniels's love interest in a minor romantic comedy called Cocktail Hour (1933).

Back at Paramount, Scott acted in the Westerns Man of the Forest (1933) and To the Last Man (1933), both with Hathaway from Zane Grey novels and featuring Noah Beery Sr. as the villain. Scott was loaned to Monogram Pictures for Broken Dreams (1933) then was back with Hathaway for The Last Round-Up (1934).

Scott did three more Zane Grey Westerns without Hathaway: Wagon Wheels (1934) directed by Charles Barton (a remake of 1931's Fighting Caravans starring Gary Cooper), Home on the Range (1935) from Arthur Jacobson, and Rocky Mountain Mystery (1935) with Barton.

Film historian William K. Everson refers to the Zane Grey series as being "uniformly good". He also writes:

The Zane Grey series films were a boon for Scott, as they provided him with "an excellent training ground for both action and acting".

RKO and "A" Films
Paramount loaned Scott to RKO Radio Pictures to support Fred Astaire, Ginger Rogers and Irene Dunne in Roberta (1935), a hugely popular adaptation of the Broadway musical. RKO liked Scott and kept him on for Village Tale (1935), directed by John Cromwell, and She (1935), an adaptation of the novel by H. Rider Haggard from the makers of King Kong.

Scott went back to Paramount for So Red the Rose (1935) with Margaret Sullavan, then was reunited with Astaire and Rogers at RKO in Follow the Fleet (1936). It was another big hit. Scott was in a car drama at Paramount, And Sudden Death (1936), directed by Barton, then was loaned to independent producer Edward Small, to play Hawkeye in another adventure classic, The Last of the Mohicans, adapted from the 1826 novel by James Fenimore Cooper. A big hit, the film "gave Scott his first unqualified 'A' picture success as a lead."

At this point Paramount only put Scott in "A" films. He was a love interest for Mae West in Go West, Young Man (1936) and was reunited with Irene Dunne in a musical, High, Wide and Handsome (1937). This last film, a musical directed by Rouben Mamoulian, featured Scott in his "most ambitious performance."

Scott went to 20th Century Fox to play the romantic male lead in a Shirley Temple film, Rebecca of Sunnybrook Farm (1938). At Paramount he made a well budgeted Western The Texans (1938) with Joan Bennett then he starred in The Road to Reno (1938) at Universal.

One missed opportunity came about around this time. Due to his Southern background, Scott was considered for the role of Ashley Wilkes in Gone with the Wind, but it was Leslie Howard who eventually got the part.

20th Century Fox
Scott's contract with Paramount ended and he signed a deal with Fox. They put him in Jesse James (1939), a lavish highly romanticized account of the famous outlaw (Tyrone Power) and his brother Frank (Henry Fonda). Scott was billed fourth as a sympathetic marshal after the James brothers; it was his first film in color.

Scott was reunited with Temple in Susannah of the Mounties (1939), Temple's last profitable film for Fox. The studio gave him the lead in Frontier Marshal (1939), playing Wyatt Earp, after which he went to Columbia to star in a medium budget action film, Coast Guard (1939). Back at Fox he was in a war movie, 20,000 Men a Year (1939).

Scott went over to Warner Bros to make Virginia City (1940), billed third after Errol Flynn and Miriam Hopkins, playing Flynn's antagonist, a Confederate officer – but a sympathetic one, and not the actual villain (which was played by Humphrey Bogart). There were frequent disputes between director Michael Curtiz, actors and producer Hal Wallis about script changes. But Curtiz recalled that Scott tried to stay out of those arguments: "Randy Scott is a complete anachronism," said Curtiz. "He's a gentleman. And so far he's the only one I've met in this business..." According to Nott, Curtiz and Scott got along well both personally and creatively, with Scott giving one of the top performances in his career.

Scott went back to RKO to play the "other man" role in the Irene Dunne–Cary Grant romantic comedy My Favorite Wife (1940), a huge hit for RKO. For Universal, he starred with Kay Francis in When the Daltons Rode (1940). Back at Fox, Scott returned to Zane Grey country by co-starring with Robert Young in the Technicolor production Western Union, directed by Fritz Lang. Scott played a "good bad man" in this film and gave one of his finest performances. Bosley Crowther of The New York Times wrote:

Randolph Scott, who begins to look and act more and more like William S. Hart, herein shapes one of the truest and most appreciable characters of his career as the party's scout.

In 1941, Scott also co-starred with a young Gene Tierney in another western, Belle Starr. followed by a spy film with Elisabeth Bergner, Paris Calling (1941).

Universal
Scott's only role as a truly evil villain was in Universal's The Spoilers (1942), an adaptation of Rex Beach's 1905 tale of the Alaskan gold rush also starring Marlene Dietrich and John Wayne. The Dietrich-Scott-Wayne combination led to Universal casting the trio that same year in Pittsburgh, a war-time action-melodrama. Scott was billed above Wayne in both films but Wayne actually played the heroic leading man roles and enjoyed more screen time in each movie.

World War II
Shortly after the United States entered World War II, Scott attempted to obtain an officer's commission in the Marines, but because of a back injury years earlier he was rejected. However, he did his part for the war effort by touring in a comedy act with Joe DeRita (who later became a member of the Three Stooges) for the Victory Committee showcases, and he also raised food for the government on a ranch that he owned.

In 1942 and 1943, Scott appeared in several war films, notably To the Shores of Tripoli (1942) at Fox, Bombardier (1943) at RKO, the Canadian warship drama Corvette K-225 (1943) (produced by Howard Hawks), Gung Ho! at Universal and China Sky (1945) at RKO. He also made The Desperadoes (1943), Columbia Pictures' first feature in Technicolor. The film was produced by Harry Joe Brown, with whom Scott would form a business partnership several years later.

Scott was one of many Universal stars who made a cameo in Follow the Boys (1944). He was in a "northern" with Gypsy Rose Lee, Belle of the Yukon (1944), and made a swashbuckler film for producer Benedict Bogeaus alongside Charles Laughton, the cheaply made production Captain Kidd (1945).

Post-World War II career

In 1946, after playing roles that had him wandering in and out of the saddle for many years, Scott appeared in Abilene Town, a UA release which cast him in what would become one of his classic images, the fearless lawman cleaning up a lawless town. The film "cemented Scott's position as a cowboy hero" and from this point on all but two of his starring films would be Westerns. The Scott Westerns of the late 1940s would each be budgeted around US$1,000,000, equal to $ today. Scott mostly made Westerns for producers Nat Holt or Harry Joe Brown at Warner Bros, although he did make Albuquerque (1948) at Paramount.

The BFI Companion to the Western noted:In his earlier Westerns ... the Scott persona is debonair, easy-going, graceful, though with the necessary hint of steel. As he matures into his fifties his roles change. Increasingly Scott becomes the man who has seen it all, who has suffered pain, loss, and hardship, and who has now achieved (but at what cost?) a stoic calm proof against vicissitude.

Non-Westerns
Scott's last non-Westerns were a mystery with Peggy Ann Garner at Fox, Home Sweet Homicide (1947), and a family drama for Bogeaus, Christmas Eve (1947). He also had a cameo in Warners' Starlift (1951).

Nat Holt
Scott did two Westerns for Nat Holt at RKO, Badman's Territory (1946) and Trail Street (1947). He followed it with another pair for Holt at that studio, Return of the Bad Men (1948) at RKO and Canadian Pacific (1949), then they did Fighting Man of the Plains (1950) and The Cariboo Trail (1950) at Fox.

Scott also made Rage at Dawn in 1955 for Nat Holt, which was released by RKO starring Scott and Forrest Tucker, and featuring Denver Pyle, Edgar Buchanan, J. Carrol Naish and Myron Healey. It purports to tell the true story of the Reno Brothers, an outlaw gang which terrorized the American Midwest, particularly in the area around Seymour, Indiana, soon after the American Civil War.

Harry Joe Brown
Scott renewed his acquaintance with producer Harry Joe Brown at Columbia with Gunfighters (1947). They began producing many of Scott's Westerns, including several that were shot in the two-color Cinecolor process. Their collaboration resulted in the film Coroner Creek (1948) with Scott as a vengeance-driven cowpoke who "predates the Budd Boetticher/Burt Kennedy heroes by nearly a decade," and The Walking Hills (1949), a modern-day tale of gold hunters directed by John Sturges.

They followed it with The Doolins of Oklahoma (1949), The Nevadan (1950), Santa Fe (1951), Man in the Saddle (1951), Hangman's Knot (1952), The Stranger Wore a Gun (1953) (shot in 3-D), Ten Wanted Men (1955), and A Lawless Street (1955) (with Angela Lansbury.)

Warner Bros.
Scott did Colt .45 (1950) at Warner Bros. where his salary was US$100,000 per picture (equal to $ today). He stayed at the studio to do Sugarfoot (1951), Fort Worth (1951), Carson City (1952), The Man Behind the Gun (1953), Thunder Over the Plains (1953), Riding Shotgun (1954), Tall Man Riding (1955) Most of these were directed by André de Toth.

Also of interest is Shootout at Medicine Bend shot in 1955, but released in 1957, which was Scott's last movie in black and white. The movie co-stars James Garner and Angie Dickinson.

By 1956, Scott turned 58, an age where the careers of most leading men would be winding down. Scott, however, was about to enter his most acclaimed period.

Boetticher and Kennedy films

In 1955, screenwriter Burt Kennedy wrote a script entitled Seven Men from Now which was scheduled to be filmed by John Wayne's Batjac Productions with Wayne as the film's star and Budd Boetticher as its director. However, Wayne was already committed to John Ford's The Searchers. Wayne therefore suggested Scott as his replacement. The resulting film, released in 1956, did not make a great impact at the time but is now regarded by many as one of Scott's best, as well as the one that launched Scott and Boetticher into a successful collaboration that totalled seven films.

While each film is independent and there are no shared characters or settings, this set of films is often called the Ranown Cycle, for the production company run by Scott and Harry Joe Brown, which was involved in their production. Kennedy scripted four of them. In these films ...
Boetticher achieved works of great beauty, formally precise in structure and visually elegant, notably for their use of the distinctive landscape of the California Sierras. As the hero of these "floating poker games" (as Andrew Sarris calls them), Scott tempers their innately pessimistic view with quiet, stoical humour, as he pits his wits against such charming villains as Richard Boone in The Tall T and Claude Akins in Comanche Station.

After 7th Cavalry (1956), Boetticher, Kennedy and Scott were reunited for their second film, The Tall T (1957), which co-starred Richard Boone. The third in the series was Decision at Sundown (1957), although that script was not written by Kennedy. The unofficial series continued with Buchanan Rides Alone (1958). Westbound (1959) is not considered part of the official cycle, although Boetticher directed it. However the last two, both written by Kennedy, were: Ride Lonesome (1959) and Comanche Station (1960)

Last film: Ride the High Country
In 1962 Scott made his final film appearance in Ride the High Country. It was directed by Sam Peckinpah and co-starred Joel McCrea, an actor who had a screen image similar to Scott's and who also from the mid-1940s on devoted his career almost exclusively to Westerns.

Scott and McCrea's farewell Western is characterized by a nostalgic sense of the passing of the Old West; a preoccupation with the emotionality of male bonding and of the experiential "gap" between the young and the old; and the fearful evocation, in the form of the Hammonds (the villains in the film), of these preoccupations transmuted into brutal and perverse forms.McCrea's role in the film is slightly larger than Scott's, although arguably less colorful, but Scott was billed above McCrea after the director tossed a coin over top billing that came up favoring Scott.

Later years
After Ride the High Country, Scott retired from film at the age of 64. A wealthy man, Scott had managed shrewd investments throughout his life, eventually accumulating a fortune worth a reputed $100 million, with holdings in real estate, gas, oil wells and securities.

He and his wife Patricia continued to live in Beverly Hills. During his retirement years, he remained friends with Fred Astaire, with whom he attended Dodgers games. An avid golfer with a putting green in his yard, Scott was a member of the Bel Air Country Club, Los Angeles Country Club and Eldorado Country Club in Indian Wells, California. He also became friends with the Reverend Billy Graham. Scott was described by his son Christopher as a deeply religious man. He was an Episcopalian and the Scott family were members of All Saints' Episcopal Church in Beverly Hills and St. Peter's Episcopal Church in Charlotte, North Carolina.

Scott owned and co-designed Cresta Verde golf course in Corona, California.

Personal life
Randolph Scott married twice. In 1936, he became the second husband of heiress Marion duPont, daughter of William du Pont Sr., and great-granddaughter of Éleuthère Irénée du Pont de Nemours, the founder of E. I. du Pont de Nemours and Company. Marion had previously married George Somerville, with Scott serving as best man at the wedding. The Scotts' marriage ended in divorce three years later. The union produced no children. Though divorced, she kept his last name nearly five decades until her death in 1983. 

In 1944, Scott married the actress Patricia Stillman, who was 21 years his junior. In 1950, they adopted two children, Sandra and Christopher.

Although Scott achieved fame as a motion picture actor, he managed to stay fairly low profile with his private life. Offscreen he was a good friend of Fred Astaire and Cary Grant. He met Grant on the set of Hot Saturday (1932), and shortly afterwards, they moved in together and shared a beach house in Malibu that became known as "Bachelor Hall". It is widely rumored, on scant circumstantial evidence, that the two were in a romantic relationship at the time. Both men and their wives and families have repeatedly denied these rumors. However, Richard Blackwell, then an actor at RKO, and photographer Jerome Zerbe who shot a series of publicity photographs of the couple in their home, both claimed to have slept with the pair; Blackwell writing in his autobiography that Grant and Scott "were deeply, madly in love, their devotion was complete." In 1944, Scott and Grant stopped living together, but they remained close friends for the rest of their lives.

Scott died of heart and lung ailments in 1987 at the age of 89 in Beverly Hills, California. He was interred at Elmwood Cemetery in Charlotte, North Carolina. He and his wife Patricia had been married for 43 years. She died in 2004 and is buried next to her husband. Their mid-century modern home was torn down in 2008. The Randolph Scott papers  (which included photos, scrapbooks, notes, letters, articles and house plans) were left to the UCLA Library Special Collections.

In popular culture
Scott's face reportedly was used as the model for the Oakland Raiders logo in 1960; the logo was redesigned in 1963. For more than 50 years, the iconic Raiders experienced only minor modifications and remained consistent with the original design.

In Thomas Pynchon's 1963 book V., the character Profane watches an unspecified Randolph Scott film and compares himself unfavorably with his hero, whom he describes as "cool, imperturbable, keeping his trap shut and only talking when he had to – and then saying the right things and not running off haphazard and inefficient at the mouth".

In the 1963 film Soldier in the Rain, when Master Sergeant Maxwell Slaughter (Jackie Gleason) defends his date's honor by protecting her from a jealous suitor, Bobby Jo Pepperdine (Tuesday Weld) exclaims "You know what? You were just like Randolph Scott on the Late, Late Movies . . . a fat Randolph Scott."

In the 1968 drama The Sergeant, the uncle of John Phillip Law's girlfriend says how much he loves American films, in particular Westerns starring Randolph Scott.

He is caricatured in the Lucky Luke comic book album Le Vingtième de cavalerie (1965) as Colonel McStraggle.

The 1974 comedy Blazing Saddles paid homage to Scott. When faced by a crowd refusing to cooperate, Sheriff Bart (Cleavon Little) exclaims "You'd do it for Randolph Scott!" Members of the crowd then repeat "Randolph Scott" in hushed tones. An unseen choir suddenly sings out the name, which causes the townsfolk to reverently remove their hats and bow their heads, after which they begin cooperating.

Scott is the putative subject of the 1974 Statler Brothers song "Whatever Happened to Randolph Scott?", lamenting the passing of Western films.

Scott is the subject of guitarist Leo Kottke's song "Turning into Randolph Scott (Humid Child)" on his 1994 album Peculiaroso.

"We'll send them all we've got, John Wayne and Randolph Scott" is a line in Tom Lehrer's song, "Send the Marines."

During the seventh season of NYPD Blue (in the episode "Jackass"), Andy Sipowicz acknowledges that he isn’t handsome, saying "I'm not Randolph Scott."

Scott is the subject of a Rodney Dangerfield joke told on the 1981 NBC special "The Stars Salute the President". In a veiled reference to Ronald Reagan (who was in attendance), Dangerfield muses how he is surprised he was invited to perform at the special, because he "voted for Randolph Scott" (both Reagan and Scott were actors in Westerns who later became involved in conservative politics).

Awards
In 1975, Scott was inducted into the Western Performers Hall of Fame at the National Cowboy & Western Heritage Museum in Oklahoma City, Oklahoma, United States. He also received an In Memoriam Golden Boot Award for his work in Westerns.

For his contribution to the motion picture industry, Scott has a star on the Hollywood Walk of Fame at 6243 Hollywood Blvd. In 1999, a Golden Palm Star on the Palm Springs, California, Walk of Stars was dedicated to him.

Politics
Scott was an active Republican. In 1944, he attended the massive rally organized by David O. Selznick in the Los Angeles Coliseum in support of the Dewey-Bricker ticket as well as Governor Earl Warren of California, who would become Dewey's running mate in 1948. The gathering drew 93,000, with Cecil B. DeMille as the master of ceremonies and short speeches by Hedda Hopper and Walt Disney. Among those in attendance were Ann Sothern, Ginger Rogers, Adolphe Menjou, and Gary Cooper. Scott also supported Barry Goldwater in the 1964 United States presidential election and Ronald Reagan in the 1966 California gubernatorial election.

Radio appearances

References

Bibliography

 Bogdanovich, Peter. Who the Hell's in It: Conversations with Hollywood's Legendary Actors. New York: Random House, 2010. .
 Boscombe, Edward (ed.). The BFI Companion to the Western. New York: DiCapo Press, 1988. .
 Crow, Jefferson Brim, III. Randolph Scott: The Gentleman From Virginia. Silverton, Idaho: Wind River Publishing, 1987. .
 Everson, William K. The Hollywood Western: 90 Years of Cowboys and Indians, Train Robbers, Sheriffs and Gunslingers, and Assorted Heroes and Desperados. New York: Citadel Press, 1992, First edition 1969. .
 Gritten, David (ed.). Halliwell's Film Guide 2008 (Halliwell's the Movies That Matter). New York: Harper Collins, 2008. .
 Jordan, David M. FDR, Dewey, and the Election of 1944. Bloomington, Indiana: Indiana University Press, 2011. .
 Mueller, John. Astaire Dancing: The Musical Films. New York: Alfred A. Knopf, 1985. .
 Nott, Robert. The Films of Randolph Scott. Jefferson, North Carolina: McFarland & Company, 2004. .
 Nott, Robert. Last of the Cowboy Heroes: The Westerns of Randolph Scott, Joel McCrea, and Audie Murphy. Jefferson, North Carolina: McFarland, 2005, First edition 2000. .
 Scott, C. H. Whatever Happened to Randolph Scott? Madison, North Carolina: Empire Publishing, 1994. .
 Thomas, Tony. Hollywood and the American Image. Westport, Connecticut: Arlington House, 1981. .

External links

 
 Randolph Scott at Virtual History
 

1898 births
1987 deaths
20th-century American male actors
American Episcopalians
American male film actors
American people of Scottish descent
Burials in North Carolina
California Republicans
Deaths from lung disease
Georgia Tech alumni
Male Western (genre) film actors
Male actors from Charlotte, North Carolina
Male actors from Virginia
Military personnel from Virginia
Paramount Pictures contract players
People from Orange County, Virginia
People from Valley Center, California
United States Army Field Artillery Branch personnel
United States Army officers
United States Army personnel of World War I
Woodberry Forest School alumni